Evan Amos (born 1983) is a photographer of stock photography of video game consoles, which he licenses freely to the public domain. He contributes these images to the online encyclopedia Wikipedia, and  works on The Vanamo Online Game Museum, a free digital archive of video game hardware. As of 2018, he resides in Brooklyn, New York City.

Work

Being "annoyed" at the poor quality of images of video game consoles on Wikipedia, Amos decided to document these systems before they were "forgotten in time". Starting in August 28, 2010, with Nintendo's Wii console, which he happened to own, Amos soon "felt addicted" and started a list of every console. He put an ad on Craigslist and met a collector in Huntington, Long Island, where he photographed various consoles from Sega and Atari. He has expressed "surprise" at the increasing popularity of his freely licensed photos in print, television, Internet, and other media – though he is still rarely credited for them.

After purchasing and photographing video game consoles, Amos donates them to the New York University Game Center and the National Museum of Play, where he is allowed to access them at any time. His library expanded to food items.

In 2013, Amos raised  on Kickstarter to expand his hardware collection and build the Vanamo Online Game Museum, for online preservation of the history of video games. It is intended to include an extensive history of each console and its development.

On November 6, 2018, Amos released a book published by No Starch Press, titled The Game Console: A Photographic History from Atari To Xbox, showcasing video game console photos, their hardware, and some history.

Selected works

Reception
Destructoid called Amos "gaming's most popular photographer". Popular Science called him "gaming's most famous photographer". Kotaku called The Game Console "an outstanding book for people who like looking at video game consoles".

See also
 List of Wikipedia people

References

Sources

External links

1983 births
Living people
Photographers from New York City
Wikimedia image contributors
American Wikimedians
Wikipedia people